HYFLEX (Hypersonic Flight Experiment) was a National Space Development Agency of Japan reentry demonstrator prototype which was launched in 1996 on the only flight of the J-I launcher. It was a successor of OREX and was a precursor for the Japanese space shuttle HOPE-X.

HYFLEX tested the carbon-carbon heat shielding tiles that were intended to be used on HOPE, as well as having the same body shaping in order to gather data on hypersonic lifting. HYFLEX flew in space at  altitude and succeeded in re-entry, but sank in the Pacific after splashdown before it could be recovered.

Overview
HYFLEX was an uncrewed lifting body space plane for gaining technological prowess in the design, production, and flight of hypersonic crafts, as well as technology validation of atmospheric reentry. The experimental vehicle was covered in carbon–carbon, ceramic tiles, and flexible thermal insulation, which were materials that was to be used for HOPE.

Attitude control was performed by gas thrusters and aerodynamic rudders. During its descent the craft glided in a right turn circling the island of Chichijima in the Ogasawara Archipelago. HYFLEX had various sensors attached to each parts, and succeeded in gaining data on surface aerodynamic heating and pressure. The craft splashed down in the waters northeast of Chichijima with parachutes, however the floats and riser broke off while floating and recovery was abandoned. HYFLEX was succeeded by ALFLEX.

See also 
 1996 in spaceflight
 Intermediate eXperimental Vehicle

References

Satellites of Japan
Spaceplanes